Cho Young-jeung (born 18 August 1954) is a South Korean former footballer who played as a defender. He won two Asian Games, and participated in the 1986 FIFA World Cup.

Club career 
Cho was allowed to participate in tryouts for NASL clubs by the Korea Football Association when the national team left for Los Angeles to train in February 1981. He joined Portland Timbers after having offers from four clubs. He played both football and indoor soccer for Portland Timbers, becoming the first Asian to play indoor soccer. In 1982, he made the cover of Kick, the official magazine of the NASL, and was selected for the first team of the NASL all-stars. He returned to his country after the K League was founded in 1983.

Style of play 
Cho was one of the best centre-backs in South Korea and the United States during the 1980s. He didn't have rapid pace and great stamina, but he was noted for his prediction, positional sense and team play. He also had a burly physique and so was skilled in tussle and tackle.

Career statistics

Club

International 

Results list South Korea's goal tally first.

Honours

Player 
ROK Navy
Korean Semi-professional League (Spring): 1978
Korean President's Cup: 1979

Lucky-Goldstar Hwangso
K League 1: 1985

South Korea
Asian Games: 1978, 1986
AFC Asian Cup runner-up: 1980
Afro-Asian Cup of Nations: 1987

Individual
Korean FA Best XI: 1975, 1977, 1978, 1979, 1980, 1986
Korean FA Player of the Year: 1977
NASL All-Star First Team: 1982; Second Team: 1983
K League 1 Best XI: 1984, 1986

Manager 
LG Cheetahs
Korean League Cup runner-up: 1994

See also
 List of men's footballers with 100 or more international caps

References

External links
 
 Cho Young-jeung – National Team Stats at KFA 
 
 North American Soccer League Player Profile
 

1954 births
Living people
Association football defenders
South Korean footballers
South Korean expatriate footballers
South Korea international footballers
South Korean football managers
Portland Timbers (1975–1982) players
Chicago Sting (NASL) players
K League 1 players
FC Seoul players
FC Seoul managers
K League 1 managers
FC Seoul non-playing staff
North American Soccer League (1968–1984) players
North American Soccer League (1968–1984) indoor players
Expatriate soccer players in the United States
1980 AFC Asian Cup players
1986 FIFA World Cup players
People from Paju
South Korean expatriate sportspeople in the United States
Asian Games medalists in football
Footballers at the 1978 Asian Games
Footballers at the 1986 Asian Games
Asian Games gold medalists for South Korea
Medalists at the 1978 Asian Games
Medalists at the 1986 Asian Games
FIFA Century Club
Sportspeople from Gyeonggi Province